School 2013 is a 2012 South Korean television series starring Jang Nara, Choi Daniel, Lee Jong-suk, Park Se-young and Kim Woo-bin. The teen drama depicts the struggles and dilemmas that modern-day Korean youth face, such as bullying, student suicides, school violence, deteriorating teacher-student relations, private tutoring and other real-life high school issues, all within the confines of one small classroom at Victory High School.

It is the fifth installment of KBS's School series which aired from 1999 through 2002. It aired on KBS2 from December 3, 2012 to January 28, 2013 on Mondays and Tuesdays at 21:55 for 16 episodes.

Synopsis
Jung In-jae (Jang Na-ra) and Kang Sae-chan (Choi Daniel) are homeroom teachers whose philosophies are apparently at odds. Together, they
manage Victory High's toughest class; facing bullies, academic underachievers, and demanding parents, as they help the students overcome their problems.

Cast
Teachers
 Jang Na-ra as Jung In-jae, homeroom teacher
 Choi Daniel as Kang Se-chan, former top lecturer
 Um Hyo-sup as Uhm Dae-woong "Uhm Force", math teacher
 Park Hae-mi as Im Jung-soo, principal
 Lee Han-wi as Woo Soo-chul, vice principal
 Oh Young-sil as Yoo Nan-hee, ethics teacher
 Yoon Joo-sang as Jo Bong-soo, gym teacher
 Kwon Nam-hee as Kwon Nam-hee
 Kim Yun-ah as Kim Yun-ah
 Lee Won-suk as Kim Dae-soo

Students
 Lee Jong-suk as Go Nam-soon
 Park Se-young as Song Ha-Gyeong
 Ryu Hyo-young as Lee Kang-joo
 Kim Woo-bin as Park Heung-soo
 Gil Eun-hye as Gil Eun Hye
 Kwak Jung-wook as Oh Jung-ho
 Choi Chang-yub as Kim Min-ki
 Kim Young-choon as Byun Ki-duk
 Kim Jong Hyun
 Kim Dong-suk as Kim Dong-suk
 Jeon Soo-jin as Kye Na-ri
 Shin Hye-sun as Shin Hye-sun
 Kim Chang-hwan as Han Young-woo
 Lee Ji-hoon as Lee Ji-hoon
 Lee Yi-kyung as Lee Yi-kyung
 Jung Yeon-joo as Student
 Ahn Ji-hyun as Ahn Ji-hyun
 Kim Dani

Ratings
In the table below, the  represent the lowest ratings and the  represent the highest ratings.

Awards and nominations

References

External links
  
 
 
 

2012 South Korean television series debuts
2013 South Korean television series endings
2010s high school television series
2010s teen drama television series
Korean Broadcasting System television dramas
Korean-language television shows
South Korean high school television series
South Korean teen dramas
Television series about educators
Television series about teenagers
Television series by KeyEast
2013 South Korean television seasons